The 2009 IIHF World Championship Division II  was an international Ice hockey tournament run by the International Ice Hockey Federation.  The tournament was contested from April 6–13, 2009. Participants in this tournament were separated into two separate tournament groups. The Group A tournament was contested in Novi Sad, Serbia. Group B's games were played in Sofia, Bulgaria.

Participants

Group A

Group B

Group A Tournament

Fixtures
All times local.

Note: OT indicates that the game was won in overtime. SO indicates that the game was won through a shootout.

Standings

Group B Tournament

Fixtures
All times local.

Standings

External links
Group A fixtures and statistics at IIHF
Group B fixtures and statistics at IIHF

IIHF World Championship Division II
3
International ice hockey competitions hosted by Bulgaria
International ice hockey competitions hosted by Serbia
World
World